Elite Racing Club is a horse racing club. In 1992, Tony Hill purchased a racehorse and named it “Elite Reg” to promote his company Elite Registrations. Although this horse didn’t become a well known name in the horseracing world, this became the trigger to start Elite Racing Club.

The now 10,000 members pay an annual fee (£199) to join the club and renewal discounts are available after the first year of membership.

Members receive a share of the prizemoney earned by the club's horses. Additionally they receive a weekly newsletter, plus options to visit both the stables as well as courses where the club's horses are racing, with opportunities for members to gain both paddock and winner enclosure entry.

In recent years the club has focused increasingly on breeding racehorses who will go on to race for the club. It has achieved much success with this, notably with the champion mare Soviet Song.
In 2012 Elite Racing Club celebrated its 20th anniversary as the most successful racing club in Britain.

Elite had a big winner today with "Marsha" winning the Nunthorpe group 1 stakes at York (25/08/2017) beating odds on favourite Lady Aurelia.

Current Trainers
Nicky Henderson
 Julie Camacho
James Fanshawe
 Donald McCain
 Sir Mark Prescott
 Alan King (horse racing)
 Emma Lavelle
 Paul Nicholls
 Roger Charlton
 James Ferguson

Horses in Training

Amalfi Bay      (4 b g)
Citrus Grove    (3 b f)
Constancio      (9 b g)
First Of May    (2 b f)
General Medrano (5 b g)
Glenister       (3 b c)
Judicial        (10 b g)
Lady Chapel     (2 b f)
Mon Frere       (6 b g)
Quiet Sea       (2 b f)
Sarsen          (4 gr g)
Tiffany         (2 b f)
Tulin           (5 b g)
Viola           (5 ch m)
Yeoman          (2 b c)
Zapphire        (2 b f)

Yearlings

Sea The Moon/  ex Harmonica (Colt)
Ulysses/ ex Kind Of Hush (Filly)
Churchill/  ex Madison (Colt)
Pivotal/  ex Marseille (Colt)
Cable Bay/  ex Roubles (Colt)
New Approach/  ex Tribute Act (Filly)
Camelot/  ex Zest (Filly)

Foals born in 2022

 TBC

Former Horses in Training
Affinity (subsequently became a broodmare for club)
Affirm
Alabang
Alzanti
Atomic Winner
Baboushka
Ballycarney
Band Of Love
Baralinka (subsequently became a broodmare for club) - now deceased
Bardd (Sold on)
Barron Bay
Bayrak
Beckenham Lady
Bid for Fame
Big Cat Jazz (Deceased)
Boarding Party (Sold on - was racing in Dubai)
Border Patrol
Boston Lodge (GB)
Brass Tacks
Brecon Beacon
Bubbly - (Sold on)
Burgundy
By The Light - (Retired)
Canasta - (subsequently became a broodmare for club)
Captain Bliss
Care and Comfort
Carmarthen
Celsius
Cherished
China Belle (Sold on)
China Tea (subsequently became a broodmare for club) - now deceased
Circle Of Stars
Classic Minstrel
Clemency (Sold on)
Club Elite
Colonial Sunrise
Count Tirol
Cross Talk
Dancing Bay
Dandino (Sold on - now a sire in Australia)
Daffyd
Dansette  (Sold on - has progeny by Henrythenavigator)
Delightfully
Demon Dancer
Dilly Lane
Director General
Dixie Jazz
Domino Style
Don't Tell the Wife
Doyly Carte (Sold on)
Dungarvans Choice
Eisteddfod
Elgin
Elite Bliss
Elite Hope
Elite Justice
Elite Number
Elite Racing
Empire Park
Entranced
Fanfaron
Faugeron
Favorisio
Ffestiniog (subsequently became a broodmare for club) -now deceased
Finbar
Frisco Bay
Generous Diana (subsequently became a broodmare for club) - now sold on
Geology (Sold on)
Glamorgan
Global Search
Good Fetch
Hamilton Silk
Harlech Castle
Harmonica (subsequently became a broodmare for club)
Halogen
Iambe De La See
Imgonnawin
Inherent
Ionian Spring
Kabayil (subsequently became a broodmare for club) - now deceased
Kadount
Kalinka (subsequently became a broodmare for club) - now deceased
Kalinova (subsequently became a broodmare for club - sold on/now deceased)
Kalithea
Kasamba
Kazatzka
Keyhaven
Kidding Apart
Kingsville
Kindly Note - (Retired)
Kind Of Hush (subsequently became a broodmare for club)
Knighted
Lady Angela (sold to Northern Farms - Japan)
Lady For Life
Latin Leader
Lisheen Castle (now retired)
Llewellyn (Sold on)
Logan
Lord High Admiral (CAN)
Loretta - (subsequently became a broodmare for club)
Loveyoumillions
Lumberjack
Lumpy's Gold - (Retired)
Madison (subsequently became a broodmare for club)-now deceased
Magistrate (Retired)
Man Of Harlech 
Marbles
Margarita (subsequently became a broodmare for club)- now sold on
Marlatara
Marlinka  (subsequently became a broodmare for club) - now deceased
Marseille (subsequently became a broodmare for club)
Marsha (Sold to Coolmore for 6,000,000 guineas) - Has a filly (born 2020) by Galileo.
McGillycuddy Reeks
Miracle Kid
Mister Dillon
Mithian
Monolith
Most Stylish
My Kind
Mysilv
Natterjack
New Fforest (subsequently became a broodmare for club) - now deceased
New Seeker
New Romantic
Oceans Apart (subsequently became a broodmare for club & Owners Group)  - now retired
Ocean Gift
Officer Dibble
Oh So Quiet
One Vision
Pacific Grove
Pakaradyssa
Panama Cat
Paradise Navy (GB)
Party In The Park
Peace Corps
Penzance
Persian Elite (IRE)
Phantom Star
Pharazini
Pomme Secret (FR)
Red Fanfare
Rehearsal
Reims
Reverb - (Retired)
Ribbons (Now sold on -has progeny named: Tilly Frankl, Missile and Soulcombe
River Tarquin
Roi De L'Odet
Roubles (subsequently became broodmare for club)
Royal Crest I
Royal Variety
Rumi
Ruling Party
Rustic Charm
Safebreaker
Salsa Time
Searchlight - (Retired)
Seixo Branco
Sentinel (Sold on)
Sistine (subsequently became a broodmare for club)- now deceased
Sha Bihan
Shamrock Bay
Sherbet Lemon
Shining Oasis
Shining Sea - (subsequently became a broodmare for club)
Silva Venture
Simple Rhythm
Sincerity
Sinnfonia  (Sold on)
Sister Act (subsequently became a broodmare for club - now deceased)
Soviet Dream (now deceased)
Soviet Song (subsequently became a broodmare for club) - now deceased - (Progeny - Roubles) 
Spanish Lace
Spencer's Revenge
Stars Above Me (subsequently became a broodmare for club) - now deceased
Stately Favour
State Of Grace
Stirrup Cup
Swiss Coast
Temps Perdu
Thefieldsofathenry
Top Tug (Retired)
To The Sea
Travolta
Treacle Jones
Treason Trial
Tredegar
Tribute Act (subsequently became a broodmare for club)
Trompette (subsequently became a broodmare for club) - now sold on
Twinkle Twinkle
Vent D'Aout (subsequently became a broodmare for club, now sold on)
Viennese
Vocation
Volcanic
Warsaw Waltz
Winding River
Yabadabadoo (sold on)
Young Snugfit
Yunus Emre
Zest (subsequently became a broodmare for club)

Breeding
A list of broodmares currently owned by the club:
Affinity -    (In foal to Calyx)         
Canasta -     (In foal to Footstepsinthesand)
Harmonica -   (In foal to Bated Breath)     
Kind of Hush -(In foal to Cityscape)
Loretta -     (In foal to Mayson)     
Marseille -   (In foal to Bated Breath)    
Roubles  -    (In foal to Territories)    
Shining Sea - (In foal to Australia)      
Tribute Act - (In foal to Kingman)

External links
Official website

British racehorse owners and breeders